Vendôme is a town in Loir-et-Cher, central France.  Most other uses of Vendome or Vendôme commemorate the famous French general Louis Joseph de Bourbon, Duke of Vendôme (1654–1712).

People
The Vendôme family were French nobles, lords of the town, who eventually came to the French throne as the Bourbon dynasty. See List of counts and dukes of Vendôme. Notable members include:

Renaud of Vendôme, both bishop of Paris from 991 to 1017 as well as count of Vendôme (1005–1017).
Fulk of Vendôme, count of Vendôme from 1028 until his expulsion in 1032 and again from 1056 to his death in 1066
Geoffrey II, Count of Anjou and count of Vendôme
Geoffrey II of Vendôme, count of Vendôme 1067-1085
John VI of Vendôme to 1365
Catherine of Vendôme, 1372 to 1403
Louis, Count of Vendôme to 1446, son of the above
From then on see House of Bourbon

Locations
Le Vendôme Beirut Hotel, Beirut
Place Vendôme, large square in Paris, with the Vendôme column (see Place Vendome for other uses)
The Vendome and the St. Ives, historic houses in Worcester, Mass., US
 Vendôme, a cinema in Brussels, Belgium, location for the Brussels Short Film Festival
Vendôme Battery, large 18th-century gun-platform in Malta
Vendome (restaurant), near Cologne, Germany
Vendôme Tower, fort in Malta built 1715

Transport
Vendôme station, a Montreal intermodal transit station for metro and commuter rail

Other
Hotel Vendome fire, 1972 fire in Boston that claimed the lives of nine firefighters
Vendome Group, American publishers
Vendôme (typeface), designed 1954